Mark Vital Jr. (born November 7, 1997) is an American football tight end and basketball guard who is a free agent. He played college basketball at Baylor University before transitioning shortly after winning a National Championship during his basketball career at Baylor University and playing in the NBA Summer League with the Portland Trail Blazers to pursue a career in the NFL.

Early life and high school career
Vital was labeled "middle school basketball's most impressive dunker" by Yahoo Sports in June 2012. He gave up football to focus on basketball in eighth grade. Vital began high school at Washington-Marion Magnet High School in Lake Charles, Louisiana. As a sophomore, he averaged 16.5 points per game and was a Class 4A All-State selection. For his final two years, Vital transferred to Advanced Preparatory International in Dallas, Texas, where he played alongside Terrance Ferguson. He competed for Southern Elite on the Amateur Athletic Union circuit. Vital committed to play college basketball for Baylor after his sophomore year of high school. At the end of his high school career, he was a four-star recruit and was considered the top player from Louisiana in the 2016 class by 247Sports.

College basketball career
Vital redshirted his first season at Baylor. While sitting out, he was a member of the practice squad and developed his offense by playing against Johnathan Motley and Ish Wainright. As a redshirt freshman, Vital averaged 6.7 points and 5.6 rebounds per game. On March 23, 2019, he recorded a career-high 17 points and eight rebounds in an 83–71 loss to first-seeded Gonzaga in the NCAA tournament second round. As a sophomore, Vital averaged 7.2 points, 7.2 rebounds and one steal per game, leading his team in rebounds and steals, and was named to the Big 12 All-Defensive Team and All-Big 12 Honorable Mention. On February 8, 2020, Vital scored a junior season-high 19 points in a 78–70 win against Oklahoma State. In his junior season, he helped Baylor become one of the best defensive teams in the nation. He averaged 9.1 points and 6.2 rebounds per game, earning Third-team All-Big 12 and Big 12 All-Defensive Team honors. He was one of four finalists for the Naismith Defensive Player of the Year Award. As a senior, Vital averaged 12.6 points and 6.7 rebounds per game, helping Baylor capture the national championship.

Career statistics

|-
| style="text-align:left;"| 2016–17
| style="text-align:left;"| Baylor
| style="text-align:center;" colspan="11"|  Redshirt
|-
| style="text-align:left;"| 2017–18
| style="text-align:left;"| Baylor
| 33 || 18 || 23.8 || .481 || .100 || .505 || 5.6 || 2.2 || .8 || .6 || 6.7
|-
| style="text-align:left;"| 2018–19
| style="text-align:left;"| Baylor
| 34 || 34 || 27.7 || .464 || .182 || .529 || 7.2 || 2.0 || 1.0 || .9 || 7.2
|-
| style="text-align:left;"| 2019–20
| style="text-align:left;"| Baylor
| 29 || 24 || 26.1 || .459 || .118 || .418 || 6.2 || 1.8 || 1.7 || .6 || 6.1
|-
| style="text-align:left;"| 2020–21
| style="text-align:left;"| Baylor
| 30 || 30 || 23.4 || .483 || .000 || .500 || 6.7 || 1.4 || 1.1 || .9 || 5.6
|- class="sortbottom"
| style="text-align:center;" colspan="2"| Career
| 126 || 106 || 25.3 || .471 || .127 || .496 || 6.4 || 1.8 || 1.1 || .8 || 6.4

Professional basketball career
After going undrafted in the 2021 NBA draft, Vital signed with the Portland Trail Blazers for NBA Summer League. On Septembar 16, 2022, Vital returned to basketball and signed with Riesen Ludwigsburg of the Basketball Bundesliga. He was released on September 24.

Professional football career

Seattle Seahawks
After revealing he was planning on making the transition to football, on September 2, 2021, Vital signed with the Seattle Seahawks practice squad. He was released on September 7.

Kansas City Chiefs
Vital signed with the Kansas City Chiefs practice squad on September 13, 2021. He signed a reserve/future contract with the Chiefs on February 2, 2022. He was released on July 28, 2022.

References

External links
Baylor Bears bio

1997 births
Living people
American men's basketball players
Basketball players from Louisiana
Baylor Bears men's basketball players
Small forwards
Sportspeople from Lake Charles, Louisiana
Players of American football from Louisiana
American football tight ends
Seattle Seahawks players
Kansas City Chiefs players